The 1993 Montreal Expos season was the 25th season of the franchise. The Expos finished in second place in the National League East division, with a record of 94 wins and 68 losses, three games behind the National League Champion Philadelphia Phillies.

Offseason
 October 6, 1992: Jerry Willard was released by the Expos.
 November 17, 1992: Doug Bochtler was drafted from the Expos by the Colorado Rockies as the 32nd pick in the 1992 MLB expansion draft.
 December 8, 1992: Curtis Pride was signed as a free agent by the Expos.
 December 9, 1992: Mark Gardner and Doug Piatt were traded by the Expos to the Kansas City Royals for Jeff Shaw and Tim Spehr.
 March 1, 1993: Vladimir Guerrero was signed as an amateur free agent by the Expos.

Spring training
The Expos held spring training at West Palm Beach Municipal Stadium in West Palm Beach, Florida – a facility they shared with the Atlanta Braves. It was their 17th season at the stadium; they had conducted spring training there from 1969 to 1972 and since 1981.

Regular season
At the end of August, the Atlanta Braves tried to acquire Dennis Martínez from the Expos. The Expos placed Martinez's name on the waiver wire and the Braves claimed him. The Expos were not about to let Martinez go to Atlanta for the waiver fee of $20,000. After claiming Martinez, the Expos contacted the Braves to see if they were interested in talking about a trade. Martinez had the final word on any movement because his seniority gives him veto rights over a trade.

Notable games
 May 28, 1993: In a contest against the Chicago Cubs at Wrigley Field the Expos and Cubs end their five inning contest in a 2–2 tie.
 September 17, 1993: One of the most exciting pennant races in team history begins, as the Expos (85 wins, 62 losses, and 1 tie) play their final series against their division rival Phillies (89 wins, 58 losses). The Expos rally back to take an 8 to 7 victory in front of 45,757 hometown fans at Montreal's Olympic Stadium. The clutch hitting hero was a hearing disabled rookie named Curtis Pride who in his first major league at-bat doubled home two runners and scored on the following play. After the game Pride said he couldn't hear the ovation but he could feel the vibration of the 45,757 Expos fans. The Expos would finish the season 94-68 but unfortunately three games out of first place.

Opening Day starters
 Moisés Alou
 Sean Berry
 Wil Cordero
 Marquis Grissom
 Ken Hill
 Tim Laker
 Mike Lansing
 John Vander Wal
 Ted Wood

Season standings

Record vs. opponents

Notable transactions
 April 14, 1993: Tim McIntosh was selected off waivers by the Expos from the Milwaukee Brewers.
 June 1, 1993: Orlando Cabrera was signed as an amateur free agent by the Expos.
 June 23, 1993: Archi Cianfrocco was traded by the Expos to the San Diego Padres for Tim Scott.
 July 16, 1993: Kent Bottenfield was traded by the Montreal Expos to the Colorado Rockies for Butch Henry.

Major League debuts
Batters:
Frank Bolick (Apr 5)
Cliff Floyd (Sep 18)
Lou Frazier (Apr 8)
Mike Lansing (Apr 7)
Oreste Marrero (Aug 12)
Charlie Montoyo (Sep 7)
Curtis Pride (Sep 14)
Joe Siddall (Jul 28)
Derrick White (Jul 22)
Rondell White (Sep 1)
Pitchers:
Brian Looney (Sep 26)
Kirk Rueter (Jul 7)

Roster

Game log

|- style="background-color:#fbb;"
| 1 || April 5 || @ Reds || 1–0 || Rijo (1–0) || Martínez (0–1) || Dibble (1) || 55,456 || 0–1
|- style="background-color:#cfc;"
| 2 || April 7 || @ Reds || 5–1 || Hill (1–0) || Smiley (0–1) || Rojas (1) || 26,168 || 1–1
|- style="background-color:#cfc;"
| 3 || April 8 || @ Reds || 14–11 || Barnes (1–0) || Henry (0–1) || Rojas (2) || 26,280 || 2–1
|- style="background-color:#fbb;"
| 4 || April 9 || @ Rockies || 11–4 || Smith (1–0) || Bottenfield (0–1) || || 80,227 || 2–2
|- style="background-color:#fbb;"
| 5 || April 10 || @ Rockies || 9–5 || Nied (1–1) || Martínez (0–2) || || 65,261 || 2–3
|- style="background-color:#cfc;"
| 6 || April 11 || @ Rockies || 19–9 || Jones (1–0) || Henry (0–1) || || 66,987 || 3–3
|- style="background-color:#fbb;"
| 7 || April 13 || Astros || 9–6 || Williams (1–0) || Rojas (0–1) || || 51,539 || 3–4
|- style="background-color:#fbb;"
| 8 || April 14 || Astros || 9–5 || Portugal (1–0) || Gardiner (0–1) || || 12,345 || 3–5
|- style="background-color:#cfc;"
| 9 || April 15 || Astros || 2–1 || Jones (2–0) || Drabek (1–2) || Rojas (3) || 13,377 || 4–5
|- style="background-color:#cfc;"
| 10 || April 16 || Rockies || 3–2 || Bottenfield (1–1) || Henry (0–2) || Rojas (4) || 17,483 || 5–5
|- style="background-color:#fbb;"
| 11 || April 17 || Rockies || 9–1 || Ruffin (1–1) || Martínez (0–3) || || 23,166 || 5–6
|- style="background-color:#cfc;"
| 12 || April 18 || Rockies || 4–2 || Hill (2–0) || Wayne (0–1) || || 25,034 || 6–6
|- style="background-color:#cfc;"
| 13 || April 20 || Dodgers || 7–3 || Nabholz (1–0) || Candiotti (0–2) || || 10,404 || 7–6
|- style="background-color:#cfc;"
| 14 || April 21 || Dodgers || 6–4 || Jones (3–0) || Astacio (0–2) || Barnes (1) || 11,194 || 8–6
|- style="background-color:#cfc;"
| 15 || April 22 || Dodgers || 3–1 || Fassero (1–0) || Hershiser (2–2) || Rojas (5) || 10,683 || 9–6
|- style="background-color:#cfc;"
| 16 || April 23 || Giants || 7–2 || Martínez (1–3) || Wilson (0–2) || Barnes (2) || 19,401 || 10–6
|- style="background-color:#cfc;"
| 17 || April 24 || Giants || 6–1 || Hill (3–0) || Burba (2–1) || || 22,036 || 11–6
|- style="background-color:#fbb;"
| 18 || April 25 || Giants || 4–1 || Swift (1–1) || Nabholz (1–1) || Beck (6) || 27,272 || 11–7
|- style="background-color:#cfc;"
| 19 || April 26 || @ Padres || 6–4 || Jones (4–0) || Taylor (0–1) || Wetteland (1) || 10,126 || 12–7
|- style="background-color:#fbb;"
| 20 || April 27 || @ Padres || 4–1 || Benes (4–1) || Bottenfield (1–2) || || 13,692 || 12–8
|- style="background-color:#fbb;"
| 21 || April 28 || @ Dodgers || 6–1 || Astacio (1–2) || Martínez (1–4) || || 35,896 || 12–9
|- style="background-color:#cfc;"
| 22 || April 29 || @ Dodgers || 7–3 || Hill (4–0) || R. Martínez (2–3) || || 32,045 || 13–9
|- style="background-color:#fbb;"
| 23 || April 30 || @ Giants || 5–2 || Swift (2–1) || Nabholz (1–2) || || 20,893 || 13–10

|- style="background-color:#fbb;"
| 24 || May 1 || @ Giants || 7–3 || Brantley (2–1) || Jones (4–1) || || 23,234 || 13–11
|- style="background-color:#fbb;"
| 25 || May 2 || @ Giants || 4 – 3  || Jackson (2–1) || Fassero (1–1) || || 29,913 || 13–12
|- style="background-color:#cfc;"
| 26 || May 4 || Padres || 6–1 || Martínez (2–4) || Harris (1–5) || || 11,739 || 14–12
|- style="background-color:#cfc;"
| 27 || May 5 || Padres || 6–5 || Wetteland (1–0) || Rodriguez (1–1) || || 12,548 || 15–12
|- style="background-color:#cfc;"
| 28 || May 7 || @ Pirates || 1–0 || Nabholz (2–2) || Tomlin (1–3) || Wetteland (2) || 30,984 || 16–12
|- style="background-color:#fbb;"
| 29 || May 8 || @ Pirates || 10 – 9  || Belinda (1–0) || Bottenfield (1–3) || || 33,739 || 16–13
|- style="background-color:#fbb;"
| 30 || May 9 || @ Pirates || 6 – 5  || Minor (4–0) || Barnes (1–1) || || 17,714 || 16–14
|- style="background-color:#cfc;"
| 31 || May 11 || Marlins || 6–4 || Rojas (1–1) || Carpenter (0–1) || Wetteland (3) || 14,048 || 17–14
|- style="background-color:#fbb;"
| 32 || May 12 || Marlins || 10–7 || Lewis (1–0) || Nabholz (2–3) || Harvey (11) || 14,562 || 17–15
|- style="background-color:#cfc;"
| 33 || May 13 || Marlins || 5–4 || Wetteland (2–0) || Corsi (0–1) || || 11,870 || 18–15
|- style="background-color:#cfc;"
| 34 || May 14 || Mets || 8–7 || Aldred (1–0) || Innis (0–2) || Wetteland (4) || 21,083 || 19–15
|- style="background-color:#cfc;"
| 35 || May 15 || Mets || 2–1 || Nabholz (3–3) || Saberhagen (3–4) || Barnes (3) || 24,548 || 20–15
|- style="background-color:#cfc;"
| 36 || May 16 || Mets || 4 – 3  || Fassero (2–1) || Young (0–4) || || 22,898 || 21–15
|- style="background-color:#fbb;"
| 37 || May 17 || @ Braves || 5–2 || Avery (3–2) || Martínez (2–5) || Stanton (16) || 43,703 || 21–16
|- style="background-color:#cfc;"
| 38 || May 18 || @ Braves || 1–0 || Heredia (1–0) || Smith (2–3) || Wetteland (5) || 46,099 || 22–16
|- style="background-color:#fbb;"
| 39 || May 19 || @ Braves || 1–0 || Glavine (6–0) || Shaw (0–1) || || 48,936 || 22–17
|- style="background-color:#fbb;"
| 40 || May 20 || @ Phillies || 9–3 || Schilling (5–1) || Nabholz (3–4) || || 28,103 || 22–18
|- style="background-color:#cfc;"
| 41 || May 21 || @ Phillies || 6–2 || Hill (5–0) || Jackson (4–2) || Rojas (6) || 41,146 || 23–18
|- style="background-color:#cfc;"
| 42 || May 22 || @ Phillies || 6–5 || Fassero (3–1) || Williams (1–1) || Wetteland (6) || 37,911 || 24–18
|- style="background-color:#fbb;"
| 43 || May 23 || @ Phillies || 14–7 || Mulholland (5–4) || Heredia (1–1) || West (2) || 52,911 || 24–19
|- style="background-color:#fbb;"
| 44 || May 24 || Cardinals || 4 – 1  || Cormier (2–3) || Rojas (1–2) || Smith (13) || 11,725 || 24–20
|- style="background-color:#cfc;"
| 45 || May 25 || Cardinals || 4–2 || Fassero (4–1) || Tewksbury (4–4) || Wetteland (7) || 15,383 || 25–20
|- style="background-color:#cfc;"
| 46 || May 26 || Cardinals || 6–0 || Hill (6–0) || Magrane (2–5) || || 14,766 || 26–20
|- style="text-align:center;"
| 47 || May 28 || @ Cubs || 2 – 2  || || || || 28,523 || 26–20
|- style="background-color:#cfc;"
| 48 || May 29 || @ Cubs || 5–4 || Martínez (3–5) || Scanlan (1–3) || Wetteland (8) || 36,740 || 27–20
|- style="background-color:#fbb;"
| 49 || May 30 || @ Cubs || 5–2 || Bautista (1–0) || Shaw (0–2) || || 36,767 || 27–21
|- style="background-color:#fbb;"
| 50 || May 31 || @ Astros || 2–1 || Jones (2–4) || Rojas (1–3) || || 21,176 || 27–22

|- style="background-color:#cfc;"
| 51 || June 1 || @ Astros || 2–1 || Wetteland (3–0) || Drabek (5–6) || || 21,132 || 28–22
|- style="background-color:#fbb;"
| 52 || June 2 || @ Astros || 5–4 || Jones (3–4) || Rojas (1–4) || || 21,405 || 28–23
|- style="background-color:#cfc;"
| 53 || June 3 || Cubs || 7–1 || Martínez (4–5) || Morgan (3–7) || || 15,507 || 29–23
|- style="background-color:#cfc;"
| 54 || June 4 || Cubs || 3–1 || Shaw (1–2) || Guzmán (4–5) || Wetteland (9) || 22,786 || 30–23
|- style="background-color:#cfc;"
| 55 || June 5 || Cubs || 6–3 || Fassero (5–1) || Bautista (1–1) || Wetteland (10) || 20,209 || 31–23
|- style="background-color:#fbb;"
| 56 || June 6 || Cubs || 4–1 || Hibbard (7–3) || Hill (6–1) || Myers (17) || 16,404 || 31–24
|- style="background-color:#fbb;"
| 57 || June 7 || Reds || 12–3 || Smiley (3–7) || Heredia (1–2) || || 10,023 || 31–25
|- style="background-color:#cfc;"
| 58 || June 8 || Reds || 4–2 || Martínez (5–5) || Pugh (3–7) || Wetteland (11) || 11,777 || 32–25
|- style="background-color:#fbb;"
| 59 || June 9 || Reds || 3 – 2  || Cadaret (2–1) || Gardiner (0–2) || Ayala (2) || 11,157 || 32–26
|- style="background-color:#fbb;"
| 60 || June 10 || @ Cardinals || 7–4 || Tewksbury (5–6) || Rojas (1–5) || Smith (17) || 26,193 || 32–27
|- style="background-color:#fbb;"
| 61 || June 11 || @ Cardinals || 1–0 || Magrane (4–6) || Bottenfield (1–4) || Smith (18) || 34,957 || 32–28
|- style="background-color:#fbb;"
| 62 || June 12 || @ Cardinals || 13–3 || Cormier (3–3) || Nabholz (3–5) || || 49,804 || 32–29
|- style="background-color:#cfc;"
| 63 || June 13 || @ Cardinals || 3–1 || Martínez (6–5) || Arocha (5–1) || Wetteland (12) || 34,351 || 33–29
|- style="background-color:#fbb;"
| 64 || June 14 || Phillies || 10–3 || Mulholland (8–5) || Shaw (1–3) || || 13,235 || 33–30
|- style="background-color:#cfc;"
| 65 || June 15 || Phillies || 8–4 || Barnes (2–1) || Greene (8–1) || || 13,142 || 34–30
|- style="background-color:#cfc;"
| 66 || June 16 || Phillies || 4 – 3  || Rojas (2–5) || West (1–2) || || 14,231 || 35–30
|- style="background-color:#cfc;"
| 67 || June 18 || Braves || 2–1 || Martínez (7–5) || Smoltz (6–6) || Wetteland (13) || 19,519 || 36–30
|- style="background-color:#fbb;"
| 68 || June 19 || Braves || 4–3 || Wohlers (1–0) || Rojas (2–6) || Stanton (20) || 27,939 || 36–31
|- style="background-color:#fbb;"
| 69 || June 20 || Braves || 5–1 || Glavine (9–3) || Shaw (1–4) || || 33,135 || 36–32
|- style="background-color:#fbb;"
| 70 || June 21 || @ Mets || 8–3 || Telgheder (1–0) || Barnes (2–2) || Maddux (3) || 21,279 || 36–33
|- style="background-color:#cfc;"
| 71 || June 22 || @ Mets || 6–3 || Rojas (3–6) || Young (0–9) || Wetteland (14) || 22,036 || 37–33
|- style="background-color:#cfc;"
| 72 || June 23 || @ Mets || 4–3 || Martínez (8–5) || Tanana (4–7) || Wetteland (15) || 22,786 || 38–33
|- style="background-color:#fbb;"
| 73 || June 25 || @ Marlins || 3–1 || Armstrong (5–8) || Hill (6–2) || Harvey (22) || 41,748 || 38–34
|- style="background-color:#cfc;"
| 74 || June 26 || @ Marlins || 4–2 || Bottenfield (2–4) || Hough (3–8) || Wetteland (16) || 43,321 || 39–34
|- style="background-color:#fbb;"
| 75 || June 27 || @ Marlins || 9–2 || Hammond (9–4) || Barnes (2–3) || || 40,649 || 39–35
|- style="background-color:#fbb;"
| 76 || June 28 || Pirates || 9 – 5  || Wakefield (4–7) || Scott (2–1) || || 17,185 || 39–36
|- style="background-color:#cfc;"
| 77 || June 29 || Pirates || 9–2 || Nabholz (4–5) || Wagner (3–4) || || 14,023 || 40–36
|- style="background-color:#cfc;"
| 78 || June 30 || Pirates || 9–1 || Gardiner (1–2) || Neagle (2–3) || Fassero (1) || 15,734 || 41–36

|- style="background-color:#cfc;"
| 79 || July 1 || Pirates || 7–5 || Rojas (4–6) || Cooke (5–4) || Wetteland (17) || 13,174 || 42–36
|- style="background-color:#fbb;"
| 80 || July 2 || Dodgers || 4–3 || R.Martínez (7–4) || Barnes (2–4) || Gott (14) || 23,368 || 42–37
|- style="background-color:#cfc;"
| 81 || July 3 || Dodgers || 6–4 || Martínez (9–5) || Gross (6–7) || Wetteland (18) || 22,979 || 43–37
|- style="background-color:#fbb;"
| 82 || July 4 || Dodgers || 1 – 0  || Gott (3–5) || Shaw (1–5) || McDowell (2) || 20,773 || 43–38
|- style="background-color:#fbb;"
| 83 || July 5 || Giants || 10–4 || Burkett (13–2) || Gardiner (1–3) || || 13,411 || 43–39
|- style="background-color:#fbb;"
| 84 || July 6 || Giants || 13–5 || Hickerson (2–1) || Bottenfield (2–5) || || 13,172 || 43–40
|- style="background-color:#cfc;"
| 85 || July 7 || Giants || 3–0 || Rueter (1–0) || Brummett (1–2) || Wetteland (19) || 13,593 || 44–40
|- style="background-color:#cfc;"
| 86 || July 8 || Padres || 5–4 || Martínez (10–5) || Greg Harris (8–9) || Wetteland (20) || 12,727 || 45–40
|- style="background-color:#cfc;"
| 87 || July 9 || Padres || 6–1 || Nabholz (5–5) || Worrell (0–3) || || 14,251 || 46–40
|- style="background-color:#cfc;"
| 88 || July 10 || Padres || 3–2 || Young (1–0) || Gene Harris (4–2) || || 30,369 || 47–40
|- style="background-color:#cfc;"
| 89 || July 11 || Padres || 5–4 || Wetteland (4–0) || Gene Harris (4–3) || Martínez (1) || 21,174 || 48–40
|- style="background-color:#fbb;"
| 90 || July 15 || @ Dodgers || 3–2 || R. Martínez (8–4) || Martínez (10–6) || Gott (17) || 40,368 || 48–41
|- style="background-color:#fbb;"
| 91 || July 16 || @ Dodgers || 2–1 || P. Martínez (7–2) || Wetteland (4–1) || || 39,878 || 48–42
|- style="background-color:#cfc;"
| 92 || July 17 || @ Dodgers || 9 – 6  || Gardiner (2–3) || Daal (1–2) || Wetteland (21) || 44,606 || 49–42
|- style="background-color:#fbb;"
| 93 || July 18 || @ Dodgers || 2–1 || Candiotti (4–5) || Shaw (1–6) || P. Martínez (2) || 35,321 || 49–43
|- style="background-color:#fbb;"
| 94 || July 19 || @ Giants || 6–2 || Burba (7–2) || Nabholz (5–6) || || 16,562 || 49–44
|- style="background-color:#fbb;"
| 95 || July 20 || @ Giants || 8–3 || Swift (13–5) || Martínez (10–7) || || 18,764 || 49–45
|- style="background-color:#fbb;"
| 96 || July 21 || @ Giants || 4–3 || Hickerson (5–1) || Rojas (4–7) || Beck (26) || 18,791 || 49–46
|- style="background-color:#cfc;"
| 97 || July 22 || @ Padres || 10–5 || Hill (7–2) || Benes (10–7) || || 10,701 || 50–46
|- style="background-color:#cfc;"
| 98 || July 23 || @ Padres || 5–0 || Fassero (6–1) || Brocail (2–6) || Rojas (7) || 14,754 || 51–46
|- style="background-color:#fbb;"
| 99 || July 24 || @ Padres || 11–4 || Worrell (1–3) || Nabholz (5–7) || || 14,053 || 51–47
|- style="background-color:#cfc;"
| 100 || July 25 || @ Padres || 5 – 4  || Wetteland (5–1) || Gene Harris (4–5) || Rojas (8) || 21,586 || 52–47
|- style="background-color:#cfc;"
| 101 || July 27 || @ Pirates || 8–6 || Scott (3–1) || Johnston (0–1) || Wetteland (22) || 14,128 || 53–47
|- style="background-color:#fbb;"
| 102 || July 28 || @ Pirates || 3–2 || Petkovsek (2–0) || Shaw (1–7) || || 13,470 || 53–48
|- style="background-color:#cfc;"
| 103 || July 29 || @ Pirates || 3 – 2  || Wetteland (6–1) || Minor (6–4) || Heredia (1) || 18,823 || 54–48
|- style="background-color:#cfc;"
| 104 || July 30 || Marlins || 11–1 || Nabholz (6–7) || Bowen (6–10) || || 22,002 || 55–48
|- style="background-color:#cfc;"
| 105 || July 31 || Marlins || 6–5 || Wetteland (7–1) || Turner (1–3) || || 36,558 || 56–48

|- style="background-color:#fbb;"
| 106 || August 1 || Marlins || 5–4 || Turner (2–3) || Barnes (2–5) || Harvey (31) || 24,162 || 56–49
|- style="background-color:#fbb;"
| 107 || August 2 || Mets || 4–3 || Saberhagen (7–7) || Hill (7–3) || Franco (8) || 16,005 || 56–50
|- style="background-color:#cfc;"
| 108 || August 3 || Mets || 3–1 || Fassero (7–1) || Tanana (5–11) || Wetteland (23) || 17,401 || 57–50
|- style="background-color:#cfc;"
| 109 || August 4 || Mets || 3–1 || Nabholz (7–7) || Fernandez (1–2) || Wetteland (24) || 17,906 || 58–50
|- style="background-color:#fbb;"
| 110 || August 5 || Mets || 12 – 9  || Draper (1–1) || Wetteland (24) || Young (2) || 26,404 || 58–51
|- style="background-color:#cfc;"
| 111 || August 6 || @ Braves || 8–2 || Rueter (2–0) || Smoltz (10–9) || || 48,564 || 59–51
|- style="background-color:#cfc;"
| 112 || August 7 || @ Braves || 5 – 3  || Scott (4–1) || Stanton (4–4) || Wetteland (25) || 48,626 || 60–51
|- style="background-color:#fbb;"
| 113 || August 8 || @ Braves || 3–2 || Avery (12–4) || Fassero (7–2) || McMichael (5) || 48,710 || 60–52
|- style="background-color:#fbb;"
| 114 || August 10 || @ Phillies || 5–2 || Schilling (10–6) || Nabholz (7–8) || || 43,104 || 60–53
|- style="background-color:#fbb;"
| 115 || August 11 || @ Phillies || 6–5 || West (4–3) || Wetteland (7–3) || || 45,260 || 60–54
|- style="background-color:#fbb;"
| 116 || August 12 || @ Phillies || 7–4 || Mason (4–8) || Scott (4–2) || Williams (31) || 45,002 || 60–55
|- style="background-color:#cfc;"
| 117 || August 13 || Cardinals || 4 – 3  || Wetteland (8–3) || Magrane (8–10) || || 21,212 || 61–55
|- style="background-color:#fbb;"
| 118 || August 14 || Cardinals || 2–0 || Watson (6–0) || Fassero (7–3) || Smith (40) || 25,820 || 61–56
|- style="background-color:#cfc;"
| 119 || August 15 || Cardinals || 7–1 || Heredia (2–2) || Arocha (10–4) || || 25,209 || 62–56
|- style="background-color:#fbb;"
| 120 || August 17 || @ Cubs || 7–2 || Guzmán (11–7) || Martínez (10–8) || || || 62–57
|- style="background-color:#cfc;"
| 121 || August 17 || @ Cubs || 6–4 || Rueter (3–0) || Harkey (8–7) || Wetteland (26) || 32,723 || 63–57
|- style="background-color:#fbb;"
| 122 || August 18 || @ Cubs || 2–0 || Hibbard (10–9) || Hill (7–4) || Bautista (1) || 30,661 || 63–58
|- style="background-color:#cfc;"
| 123 || August 19 || @ Cubs || 10–2 || Fassero (8–3) || Castillo (5–8) || || 37,944 || 64–58
|- style="background-color:#fbb;"
| 124 || August 20 || @ Reds || 4–2 || Reardon (3–4) || Rojas (4–8) || Dibble (18) || 31,022 || 64–59
|- style="background-color:#cfc;"
| 125 || August 21 || @ Reds || 6–3 || Henry (3–8) || Roper (2–3) || Wetteland (27) || 34,393 || 65–59
|- style="background-color:#cfc;"
| 126 || August 22 || @ Reds || 7–2 || Martínez (11–8) || Ayala (5–6) || || 30,655 || 66–59
|- style="background-color:#cfc;"
| 127 || August 23 || Cubs || 1–0 || Rueter (4–0) || Hibbard (10–10) || Wetteland (28) || 15,359 || 67–59
|- style="background-color:#fbb;"
| 128 || August 24 || Cubs || 6–5 || Plesac (1–1) || Hill (7–5) || Myers (37) || 16,360 || 67–60
|- style="background-color:#cfc;"
| 129 || August 25 || Cubs || 7–3 || Fassero (9–3) || Morgan (8–12) || Wetteland (29) || 18,151 || 68–60
|- style="background-color:#cfc;"
| 130 || August 27 || Astros || 3–1 || Martínez (12–8) || Drabek (7–15) || Wetteland (30) || 16,429 || 69–60
|- style="background-color:#cfc;"
| 131 || August 28 || Astros || 7–3 || Rueter (5–0) || Kile (14–5) || Rojas (9) || 24,203 || 70–60
|- style="background-color:#cfc;"
| 132 || August 29 || Astros || 3–2 || Hill (8–5) || Swindell (10–10) || Wetteland (31) || 20,701 || 71–60
|- style="background-color:#cfc;"
| 133 || August 30 || @ Rockies || 6–1 || Fassero (10–3) || Sanford (1–2) || Rojas (10) || 47,699 || 72–60
|- style="background-color:#cfc;"
| 134 || August 31 || @ Rockies || 14–3 || Heredia (3–2) || Harris (11–14) || || 46,288 || 73–60

|- style="background-color:#cfc;"
| 135 || September 1 || @ Rockies || 11–3 || Martínez (13–8) || Bottenfield (4–10) || || 46,781 || 74–60
|- style="background-color:#cfc;"
| 136 || September 3 || @ Astros || 3–0 || Rueter (6–0) || Kile (14–6) || Wetteland (32) || 28,257 || 75–60
|- style="background-color:#cfc;"
| 137 || September 4 || @ Astros || 7–5 || Hill (9–5) || Swindell (10–11) || Wetteland (33) || 22,771 || 76–60
|- style="background-color:#fbb;"
| 138 || September 5 || @ Astros || 7–1 || Portugal (14–4) || Fassero (10–4) || || 19,636 || 76–61
|- style="background-color:#cfc;"
| 139 || September 6 || Rockies || 4–3 || Scott (5–2) || Reed (7–5) || Wetteland (34) || 40,066 || 77–61
|- style="background-color:#cfc;"
| 140 || September 7 || Rockies || 4–3 || Martínez (14–8) || Moore (2–1) || Wetteland (35) || 18,988 || 78–61
|- style="background-color:#cfc;"
| 141 || September 8 || Rockies || 6–1 || Rueter (7–0) || Reynoso (9–10) || Scott (1) || 10,764 || 79–61
|- style="background-color:#cfc;"
| 142 || September 10 || Reds || 4 – 3  || Rojas (5–8) || Dibble (1–3) || || 16,420 || 80–61
|- style="background-color:#cfc;"
| 143 || September 11 || Reds || 4–2 || Boucher (1–0) || Powell (0–1) || Wetteland (36) || 29,353 || 81–61
|- style="background-color:#cfc;"
| 144 || September 12 || Reds || 3–2 || Wetteland (9–3) || Service (2–1) || || 21,055 || 82–61
|- style="background-color:#cfc;"
| 145 || September 14 || @ Cardinals || 12–9 || Rueter (8–0) || Watson (6–5) || Wetteland (37) || 21,515 || 83–61
|- style="background-color:#fbb;"
| 146 || September 15 || @ Cardinals || 5–4 || Pérez (6–2) || Barnes (2–6) || || 21,514 || 83–62
|- style="background-color:#cfc;"
| 147 || September 16 || @ Cardinals || 4–3 || Fassero (11–4) || Tewksbury (17–9) || Wetteland (38) || 28,565 || 84–62
|- style="background-color:#cfc;"
| 148 || September 17 || Phillies || 8 – 7  || Scott (6–2) || Williams (3–5) || || 45,757 || 85–62
|- style="background-color:#fbb;"
| 149 || September 18 || Phillies || 5–4 || Greene (15–3) || Boucher (1–1) || Williams (39) || 50,438 || 85–63
|- style="background-color:#cfc;"
| 150 || September 19 || Phillies || 6–5 || Scott (7–2) || Williams (3–6) || || 40,047 || 86–63
|- style="background-color:#fbb;"
| 151 || September 21 || Braves || 18–5 || Smoltz (15–10) || Hill (9–6) || || 30,585 || 86–64
|- style="background-color:#cfc;"
| 152 || September 22 || Braves || 6–1 || Fassero (12–4) || Avery (16–6) || || 18,132 || 87–64
|- style="background-color:#fbb;"
| 153 || September 23 || Braves || 6–3 || Maddux (19–9) || Martínez (14–9) || || 25,219 || 87–65
|- style="background-color:#cfc;"
| 154 || September 24 || @ Mets || 6–3 || Nabholz (8–8) || Jones (2–4) || Wetteland (39) || 17,842 || 88–65
|- style="background-color:#cfc;"
| 155 || September 25 || @ Mets || 4–1 || Boucher (2–1) || Hillman (1–9) || Heredia (2) || 19,728 || 89–65
|- style="background-color:#fbb;"
| 156 || September 26 || @ Mets || 9–3 || Telgheder (5–2) || Hill (9–7) || || 21,558 || 89–66
|- style="background-color:#fbb;"
| 157 || September 27 || @ Marlins || 3–1 || Rapp (4–5) || Fassero (12–5) || Rodriguez (3) || 30,048 || 89–67
|- style="background-color:#cfc;"
| 158 || September 28 || @ Marlins || 3–2 || Martínez (15–9) || Armstrong (9–16) || Wetteland (40) || 27,017 || 90–67
|- style="background-color:#cfc;"
| 159 || September 29 || @ Marlins || 7–1 || Nabholz (9–8) || Hammond (11–12) || || 26,579 || 91–67
|- style="background-color:#cfc;"
| 160 || September 30 || @ Marlins || 5–3 || Shaw (2–7) || Lewis (6–3) || Wetteland (41) || 25,190 || 92–67

|- style="background-color:#cfc;"
| 161 || October 1 || Pirates || 6–3 || Heredia (4–2) || Wagner (8–8) || Wetteland (42) || 14,148 || 93–67
|- style="background-color:#fbb;"
| 162 || October 2 || Pirates || 4–2 || Ballard (4–1) || Henry (3–9) || Dewey (7) || 16,126 || 93–68
|- style="background-color:#cfc;"
| 163 || October 3 || Pirates || 3–1 || Boucher (3–1) || Hope (0–2) || Wetteland (43) || 26,277 || 94–68

|-
! colspan=9 | Legend:       = Win       = LossBold = Expos team member

Player stats

Batting

Starters by position
Note: Pos = Position; G = Games played; AB = At bats; H = Hits; Avg. = Batting average; HR = Home runs; RBI = Runs batted in

Other batters
Note: G = Games played; AB = At bats; H = Hits; Avg. = Batting average; HR = Home runs; RBI = Runs batted in

Pitching

Starting pitchers
Note: G = Games pitched; IP = Innings pitched; W = Wins; L = Losses; ERA = Earned run average; SO = Strikeouts

Other pitchers
Note: G = Games pitched; IP = Innings pitched; W = Wins; L = Losses; ERA = Earned run average; SO = Strikeouts

Relief pitchers
Note: G = Games pitched; W = Wins; L = Losses; SV = Saves; ERA = Earned run average; SO = Strikeouts

Award winners
 Larry Walker, Rawlings Gold Glove Award at outfield
 Ken Hill, Pitcher of the Month, April
 John Wetteland, Pitcher of the Month, September

1993 Major League Baseball All-Star Game
 Marquis Grissom, outfield, reserve

Farm system

LEAGUE CHAMPIONS: Harrisburg

References

External links
 1993 Montreal Expos at Baseball Reference
 1993 Montreal Expos at Baseball Almanac
 

Montreal Expos seasons
Montreal Expos season
1990s in Montreal
1993 in Quebec